Østfold is a traditional region, a former county and a current electoral district in southeastern Norway. It borders Akershus and southwestern Sweden (Västra Götaland County and Värmland), while Buskerud and Vestfold are on the other side of Oslofjord. The county's administrative seat was Sarpsborg. The county controversially became part of the newly established Viken County on 1 January 2020.

Many manufacturing facilities are situated here, such as the world's most advanced biorefinery, Borregaard in Sarpsborg. Fredrikstad has shipyards. There are granite mines in Østfold and stone from these were used by Gustav Vigeland.

The county slogan is "The heartland of Scandinavia". The local dialects are characterized by their geographical proximity to Sweden.

The name
The old name of the Oslofjord was Fold; Østfold means 'the region east of the Fold' (see also Vestfold). The name was first recorded in 1543; in the Middle Ages the name of the county was Borgarsysla 'the county/sýsla of the city Borg (now Sarpsborg)'. Later, when Norway was under Danish rule, the Danish king divided the area into many baronies. These were merged into one county (amt) in 1662 - and it was then named Smaalenenes Amt 'the amt consisting of small len'. The name was changed back to Østfold in 1919.

History 

Østfold is among the nation's oldest inhabited regions, with petroglyphs (rock drawings) and burial mounds throughout the area.

In the Viking Age, the area was part of Vingulmark, which in turn was part of Viken and included Båhuslen (which is now the Swedish province called Bohuslän). It was partly under Danish rule until the time of Harald Fairhair.

Later, when Norway was under Danish rule, the Danish king divided the area into many baronies. The barony of Heggen og Frøland, consisting of the municipalities Askim, Eidsberg and Trøgstad, originally belonged to Akershus - but it was transferred to Østfold in 1768.

An ancient well-preserved Viking cemetery for more than 1000 years was discovered using ground-penetrating radar. Archaeologists also revealed at least seven other previously unknown burial mounds and the remnants of five longhouses with the help of the radar survey.

Geography 

Østfold sits between the Oslo Fjord and Sweden. It is dominated by flat landscape with a lot of woodland in the north and along the Swedish border, a major lake system in the central part, and densely populated lowland area along the coast, with a relatively large archipelago.

Norway’s longest river, the Glomma, flows through the county and out into the Oslo Fjord in Fredrikstad.

Demography 

Most of the county's population is located in the coastal area. The cities of Moss, Sarpsborg, Fredrikstad, and Halden are situated here, along with some relatively highly populated rural municipalities. Including these coastal cities, Østfold also has another two cities, Askim and Mysen.

Transport and infrastructure 

Østfold is located strategically between Oslo and Sweden. The main highway E6 between Oslo and Gothenburg runs as a motorway through the county from the southern border with Sweden and the border with Akershus county. The main highway E18 between Oslo and Stockholm goes through the county from the Swedish border in a southeast-northwest direction. The railway from Oslo to Gothenburg runs roughly parallel with E6, and there is also a railway between Ski and Sarpsborg that covers the inner part. 
There is no public airport in the county. Moss Airport was one but is now closed. The main airport for Østfold is the Oslo Airport, Gardermoen, with a population of more than 2 million people within two hours distance.

Health care
Aimed at covering general medical needs of Østfold County and [Vestby Municipality] Østfold Hospital provides medical services, diagnostics, treatment and rehabilitation to the population of the area. Hospitals, clinics or health stations are located in all municipalities of the county.

Municipalities 

Østfold had 18 municipalities:

Districts

 Kala
 Skjeberg

Cities

 Askim
 Fredrikstad
 Halden
 Moss
 Sarpsborg

Parishes

 Aremark
 Asak
 Askim
 Berg
 Borge
 Båstad
 Degernes
 Domkirken i Borge, see Vestre Fredrikstad
 Eidsberg
 Enningdal
 Fredrikshald, see Halden
 Fredrikstad
 Glemmen
 Gressvik
 Hafslund
 Halden
 Heli
 Hobøl
 Hovin
 Hvaler
 Hærland
 Idd
 Ingedal
 Kråkerøy
 Moss
 Onsøy
 Os
 Rakkestad
 Rokke
 Rolvsøy
 Rygge
 Rødenes
 Rømskog
 Råde
 Sarpsborg
 Skiptvet
 Skjeberg
 Skjebergdalen
 Spjærøy (Dypedal)
 Spydeberg
 St. Peter's
 Svinndal
 Tom
 Tomter
 Torsnes
 Trøgstad
 Trømborg
 Tune
 Ullerøy (Ullerø)
 Varteig
 Vestre Fredrikstad
 Våler
 Østre Fredrikstad
 Øymark
 Fredrikstad Branch (LDS, 1852–1925)
 Fredrikstad (Kristi Menighet, 1893–1914)
 Vestre Fredrikstad (Kristi Menighet, 1904–1933)
 Halden Branch (LDS, 1854–1949)
 Moss Branch (LDS, 1905–1949)
 Sarpsborg Branch (LDS, 1931–1949)
 Sarpsborg (Metodistkirken, 1840–1923)

Villages

 Alshus
 Borgenhaugen
 Degernes
 Elvestad
 Engalsvik
 Fosby
 Fuglevik
 Glosli
 Gressvik
 Greåker
 Grimstad
 Hafslund
 Hamnås
 Hasle
 Hauge
 Heiås
 Herføl
 Hærland
 Høysand
 Ise
 Isebakke
 Jelsnes
 Kambo
 Karlshus
 Kirkebygden
 Knapstad
 Kornsjø
 Korshavn
 Kykkelsrud
 Larkollen
 Lervik
 Missingmyr
 Mørkfoss
 Prestebakke
 Ringvoll
 Rostadneset
 Rygge
 Rød
 Saltnes
 Sandbakken
 Sandum
 Sellebakk
 Skantebygda
 Skiptvet
 Skjeberg
 Skjærhalden
 Skjærvika
 Skjønhaug
 Slevik
 Slitu
 Solbergfoss
 Sponvika
 Stikkaåsen
 Strømsfoss
 Svinesund
 Svinndal
 Tistedalen
 Tomter
 Tosebygda
 Trømborg
 Ullerøy
 Utgård
 Varteig
 Våk
 Yven
 Ørje
 Ørmen
 Øyenkilen
 Årum

Former Municipalities

 Berg
 Borge
 Degernes
 Glemmen
 Idd
 Jeløy
 Kråkerøy
 Mysen
 Onsøy
 Rolvsøy
 Rødenes
 Skjeberg
 Torsnes
 Tune
 Varteig
 Øymark

Coat of arms
The coat of arms is from modern times (1958). The lines represent sunrays at sunrise in the east. (See above under the name.) They also represent the worship of the Sun in the Bronze Age (depicted in several rock carvings found in the county).

Notable people 
 Roald Amundsen (1872–1928) - Explorer of polar regions
 Berit Ås - Politician, professor and feminist.
 Thea Foss (1857–1927) -  founder of Foss Maritime
 Hans Nielsen Hauge - (3 April 1771 – 29 March 1824) - Lay preacher
 Peder Christian Hjorth - (1792-1855) - Norwegian politician 
 Egil Olsen - Norwegian Football coach.
 Karl Ouren (1882–1943) - Norwegian-American artist
 Petter Solberg - Rally driver
 Nils Otto Tank (1800–1864) - Moravian Church religious leader
 Harald Zwart - Movie director and producer

See also
HEPRO

External links 

 Østfold fylke website (in Norwegian and English) 
  Statistics and basic interpretation regarding Østfold (in Norwegian) 
 Excavation of longhouse from the Roman Iron Age

References
Notes

 
Former counties of Norway
2020 disestablishments in Norway
Populated places disestablished in 2020
States and territories disestablished in 2020